Bochkaryovka is a rural locality (a village) in Yefremkinsky Selsoviet, Karmaskalinsky District, Bashkortostan, Russia. The population was 31 as of 2010. There is 1 street.

Geography 
Bochkaryovka is located 22 km southeast of Karmaskaly (the district's administrative centre) by road. Matrosovka is the nearest rural locality.

References 

Rural localities in Karmaskalinsky District